Han Jun  (born ) is a Chinese female track cyclist, representing China at international competitions. During the 2016–17 UCI Track Cycling World Cup she won in the team sprint at round one in Glasgow the silver medal in at round two in Apeldoorn the bronze medal.

Career results
2014
Hong Kong International Track Cup
2nd 500m Time Trial
3rd Keirin
China Track Cup
2nd Keirin
3rd Sprint
2016
Japan Track Cup
1st Keirin
2nd Sprint
2nd Keirin
China Track Cup
1st Sprint
1st Keirin

References

1990 births
Living people
Chinese female cyclists
Chinese track cyclists
Place of birth missing (living people)
21st-century Chinese women